Savang is a genus of longhorn beetles of the subfamily Lamiinae, containing the following species:

 Savang sulphuratus Pesarini & Sabbadini, 1997
 Savang vatthanai Breuning, 1963

References

Saperdini